Fidelio (minor planet designation: 524 Fidelio) is a large minor planet with a diameter of 71 km, orbiting the Sun near the center of the main asteroid belt. Fidelio contains both metals and carbon (Spectral class XC). Concerning its name, the Catalogue of Minor Planet Names and Discovery Circumstances notes, "This is the name of Leonora when disguised as a man in the opera Fidelio (composed 1805) by the German composer Ludwig van Beethoven. The name dates from a period when Max Wolf assigned the names of female operatic characters to asteroids he had newly discovered.

524 Fidelio is also the name of a song on the album Valentina by The Wedding Present.

References

External links 
 Lightcurve plot of (524) Adelaide, Antelope Hills Observatory
 
 

000524
Discoveries by Max Wolf
Named minor planets
524 Fidelio
000524
19040314